The Indonesia men's national 3x3 team represents the country in international 3x3 basketball matches and is controlled by the Indonesian Basketball Association.

It represents the country in international 3x3 (3 against 3) basketball competitions.

Competitive records

FIBA 3x3 World Cup

FIBA Asia 3x3 Cup

Asian Games

Southeast Asian Games

See also
Indonesia women's national 3x3 team
Indonesia national basketball team

References

3
Men's national 3x3 basketball teams